Slavonski Brod Synagogue was a synagogue of the Jewish Community Slavonski Brod.

Slavonski Brod Synagogue was built under Jakob Kohn, the president of the Jewish Community Slavonski Brod, in the 1896 by Hönigsberg & Deutsch architecture studio. At the time Jewish Community Slavonski Brod counted over 110 members. The synagogue was burned by Nazis in 1941, and remains were bombed by allied forces during the bombing of Slavonski Brod in 1944. Synagogue rabbi Leib Weissberg was killed with his family at the Jasenovac concentration camp in 1942. On November 3, 1994, the memorial plaque was unveiled which marks the site of the Slavonski Brod Synagogue.

Sources

References

Ashkenazi Jewish culture in Croatia
Ashkenazi synagogues
Synagogues completed in 1896
Former synagogues in Croatia
Destroyed synagogues in Croatia
Slavonski Brod
Buildings and structures in Brod-Posavina County
Buildings and structures demolished in 1941
Hönigsberg & Deutsch buildings
Buildings and structures destroyed during World War II
Synagogues destroyed by Nazi Germany